Dorodoca is a genus of moths in the family Cosmopterigidae.

Species
Dorodoca anthophoba Ghesquière, 1940
Dorodoca chrysaula (Meyrick, 1927)
Dorodoca chrysomochla Meyrick, 1915
Dorodoca eometalla Meyrick, 1926
Dorodoca leucomochla Meyrick, 1922

References
Natural History Museum Lepidoptera genus database

Cosmopteriginae